Heinrich Lummer (21 November 1932 – 15 June 2019) was a German politician and member of the Christian Democratic Union (CDU).

Life 
At the Free University of Berlin, Lummer studied German law and philosophy. He became a member of the German political party Christian Democratic Union. From 1967 to 1987, he was a member of the Abgeordnetenhaus of Berlin. From 1981 to 1986, Lummer was the senator for the Interior and Sports in Berlin. From 1987 to 1998 he was a member of the Bundestag. He was considered to be a conservative hardliner, an exponent of the right wing of his party, oftentimes even as part of the fringe right. Especially later in his life, he subscribed to several far-right conspiracy theories, such as the idea that immigration into Germany was part of a grand pland to destroy the german nation. Lummer was married, had three children and lived in Steglitz-Zehlendorf.

Works by Lummer 
 Standpunkte eines Konservativen. Sinus Verlag, 1987.
 Asyl. Ullstein-Report, 1992.

References

External links 

 
 Dossier at Spiegel Online
 Spiegel.de: Manches offenes Wort geführt (German), September 4, 1989

Members of the Abgeordnetenhaus of Berlin
Senators of Berlin
Free University of Berlin alumni
Members of the Bundestag for Berlin
Members of the Bundestag 1994–1998
1932 births
2019 deaths
Politicians from Essen
People from Steglitz-Zehlendorf
Members of the Bundestag for the Christian Democratic Union of Germany
Burials at the Waldfriedhof Zehlendorf